Les Hauteurs is a municipality in Quebec, Canada.

See also
 List of municipalities in Quebec

References

External links
 

Municipalities in Quebec
Incorporated places in Bas-Saint-Laurent